Swiss is an unincorporated rural village in Gasconade County, Missouri, United States. The village was originally founded by immigrants from Switzerland, hence its name.

Swiss is home to the Swiss Meat & Sausage Company. Founded in 1969, the company claims to employ about one dozen full-time workers and eight part-time workers. Swiss Meats has won many awards for its sausages and has been featured on The Food Network. Swiss also operates a catalogue and mail-order business.

The only other public destination in Swiss is the Silver Dollar Restaurant & Lounge. A store, school, church and post office once located in Swiss have all closed.

References

Website: Swiss Meat & Sausage Company
Website: Hermann Hill Vineyard & Inn, Restaurant Review Page

Populated places in Gasconade County, Missouri